The Journal of Urban History (abbreviated JUH) is a bimonthly peer-reviewed academic journal covering the field of urban studies. The current editor-in-chief is David Goldfield, who is Robert Lee Bailey Professor of History at the University of North Carolina at Charlotte. The journal was established in 1974 and is published by SAGE Publications in association with the Urban History Association.

History
The journal published its first issue in November 1974. Raymond A. Mohl served as editor-in-chief from the inaugural issue until 1977. At that point, Blaine A. Brownell was appointed as editor, and he was succeeded by David Goldfield in 1990. Mohl's first editorial noted that the journal would encompass a variety of subjects, methodologies, and interpretations of urbanity in the then-emerging field of urban history.

Abstracting and indexing
The journal is abstracted and indexed in Scopus and the Social Sciences Citation Index. According to Journal Citation Reports, its 2017 impact factor was 0.261.

See also
 List of planning journals
 List of history journals

References

External links
 Journal of Urban History official website
 Urban History Association official website

Publications established in 1974
English-language journals
Bimonthly journals
Urban studies and planning journals
SAGE Publishing academic journals